Bhawanipur Education Society College (or Bhawanipur College) is a private, co-educational, undergraduate college affiliated with the University of Calcutta in Kolkata, India. It is at 5, Lala Lajpat Rai Sarani (Elgin Road) of the Bhowanipore area of Kolkata.

History
The college was started in 1966 for boys and girls by the efforts and donation of money and land by Gujarati community living in Kolkata. The Six-storied building was constructed with major donations from other city-based Gujarati industrialists and businessman. The college is managed through The Bhawanipur Gujarati Education Society. The Society enjoys the status of linguistic Minority Educational Institutions under Article 30(1) of the Constitution of India.

It grew out of a school named J. J. Ajmera High School, established in 1928, which became a secondary school in 1958 and later a higher secondary school, founded in 1960 and run by the same trust. The college was known as Bhawanipur Gujarati Education Society College (BGES College) but since 2002, the word Gujarati has been dropped. Its popular name is Bhawanipur College.

Established by Gujaratis, a linguistic minority in West Bengal, it enjoys protection under Article 30 (1) of the constitution of India. Meant for educating children of the Gujarati community, it has, over the years opened its doors to all eligible students, irrespective of caste, creed, religion or language.*

Umang is the annual cultural fest and the college also conducts Model United Nation Conference which was started in 2016.

Courses

Degrees 
The following degrees are offered by the college:
B.Com (Hons) & General
B.B.A. (Hons)
B.A. (Hons) English
B.A. (Hons) Journalism and Mass Communication
B.A. (Hons) Political Science
B.A. (Hons) Sociology
B.A. (Hons) History
B.A. (Hons) Bengali
B.Sc. (Hons) Mathematics
B.Sc. (Hons) Chemistry
B.Sc. (Hons) Physics
B.Sc. (Hons) Economics
B.Sc. (Hons) Computer Science
B.Sc. (Hons) Electronics
M.Com Accountancy and Finance
M.A. English
Total Courses   : 16 courses across 5 streams
Popular Courses : BBA, BA

A sister unit of the college The Bhawanipur Design Academy runs vocational courses in Design Fundamentals, Fashion, Interior, and Textile Design, and also Creative Art, Modelling, Personality Development and Foreign languages including French, Spanish, Chinese, etc.

Fest
Umang is the annual cultural fest of the college.

Notable alumni
Dilip Sanghvi, one of the richest man in India & founder Sun Pharma
Ridhima Ghosh, Tollywood actress
Nusrat Jahan, Member of Parliament, Tollywood actress
Jeet, Tollywood action film hero
Vishal Vashishtha, TV actor
Archana Vijaya, model, video jockey, TV & sports anchor
Bipasha Basu, Bollywood actress
Naman Shaw, TV actor
Nicolette Bird, Bollywood actress
Ashok Todi, Indian industrialist, head Lux Industries Group

See also 
Education in India
Education in West Bengal
List of colleges affiliated to the University of Calcutta

References

External links
 

Universities and colleges in Kolkata
University of Calcutta affiliates
Educational institutions established in 1966
Commerce colleges in India
Arts colleges in India
Fashion schools in India
1966 establishments in West Bengal
Science colleges in India